S.E.H Kelly is a London-based company that makes clothes with mills and factories in the British Isles.

Background 
S.E.H Kelly was founded in 2009 by Sara Kelly and Paul Vincent. Sara Kelly is the design half of the duo and studied at London College of Fashion from 2000 to 2004. Upon graduating in 2004, Kelly worked for Savile Row tailoring and couture house Hardy Amies, and founded S.E.H Kelly with Paul Vincent, whose background included menswear retail and advertising, in 2009.

Workshop 
S.E.H Kelly is based in Cleeve Workshops on Boundary Street in Shoreditch in London. The workshop is Grade II-listed and is part of the Boundary Estate. English Heritage records indicate it was built in 1895 and was designed by Reginald Minton Taylor

Events 
In late October 2014, S.E.H. Kelly temporarily set up its studio at the west London shop of Vitsoe's for an exhibition entitled An Unassuming Wardrobe. The exhibition ran for ten days, from 24 October to 1 November.

References

English fashion designers
High fashion brands
Clothing brands
Clothing companies based in London
2009 establishments in the United Kingdom
Clothing companies of England
Clothing brands of the United Kingdom